Apteribis is an extinct genus of flightless birds in the ibis subfamily that was endemic to the Hawaiian Islands in the Pacific Ocean.

Distribution
The remains of the small ibises in the genus have only been found on the islands of Maui, Lanai, and Molokai, which formed part of the prehistoric island of Maui Nui until about 200,000 years ago when rising sea levels fragmented it.  Olson and James speculate that the genus was endemic to Maui Nui, that the ibises were birds of the forest floor, that because of their flightlessness they were susceptible to becoming trapped in lava tubes, and that they may have exerted heavy predation pressure on Maui Nui's land snails.

Taxonomy
Analysis of the feathers from the Lanai specimen show an affinity to New World ibises of the genus Eudocimus. The analyses also concluded that Apteribis may have had a brown-and-beige coloration similar to that of a juvenile Eudocimus ibis. This indicates that Apteribis may have evolved both their flightlessness and their coloration through a form of paedomorphosis.

Species
Two species have been described:
 †A. glenos Olson & Wetmore, 1976, the Moloka'i flightless ibis 
 †A. brevis Olson & James, 1991, the Maui flightless ibis 

The holotype of A. glenos is from the Moʻomomi dunes, and other specimens are from Ilio Point and Kalaupapa peninsula.

Fossil material collected on Maui indicates that a third species apparently occurred there; it was generally larger in size and occurred at lower elevations than A. brevis, and has been referred to as the “Maui lowland apteribis”. Another, extremely well-preserved specimen has also been recovered from Lanai, though it has not yet been described to the species level.

References

Notes

Bird genera
†
Holocene extinctions
Late Quaternary prehistoric birds
Extinct birds of Hawaii
Maui County, Hawaii
†
Fossil taxa described in 1976
Taxa named by Alexander Wetmore